Partridge Lake may refer to:

Canada
Partridge Lake (BC-Yukon)
Ontario
Partridge Lake (Partridge River), in Cochrane District
Partridge Lake (Lennox and Addington County)
Thunder Bay District
Partridge Lake (Fox River)
Partridge Lake (Namewaminikan River)

United States
Partridge Lake (Wisconsin)